Coevorden is a city and municipality in the province of Drenthe, Netherlands. During the 1998 municipal reorganisation in the province, Coevorden merged with Dalen, Sleen, Oosterhesselen and Zweeloo, retaining its name. In August 2017, it had a population of 35,267.

Etymology 
The name Coevorden means "cow ford(s)" or  "cow crossing", similar to Bosporus or Oxford.

History 

Coevorden received city rights in 1408. It is the oldest city in the province of Drenthe.

The city was captured from the Spanish in 1592 by a Dutch and English force under the command of  Maurice, Prince of Orange. The following year it was besieged by a Spanish force but the city held out until its relief in May 1594. Coevorden was then reconstructed in the early seventeenth century to an ideal city design, similar to Palmanova. The streets were laid out in a radial pattern within polygonal fortifications and extensive outer earthworks.

The city of Coevorden indirectly gave its name to both Vancouver, British Columbia, Canada and Vancouver, Washington, named after the 18th-century British explorer George Vancouver. The explorer's ancestors (and family name) originally came to England "from Coevorden" (van Coevern in Dutch Low Saxon). There is also a family of nobility with the surname van Coeverden, sometimes spelled with a K (as with Canadian kayaker Adam van Koeverden).

Geography 

The population centres in the municipality are:

 Aalden
 Achterste Erm
 Ballast
 Benneveld
 Coevorden
 Dalen
 Dalerpeel
 Dalerveen
 De Kiel
 De Mars
 Den Hool
 Diphoorn
 Eldijk
 Erm
 Gees
 Geesbrug
 Grevenberg
 't Haantje
 Holsloot
 Hoogehaar
 Kibbelveen
 Klooster
 Langerak
 Meppen
 Nieuwe Krim
 Nieuwlande
 Noord-Sleen
 Oosterhesselen
 Padhuis
 Pikveld
 Schimmelarij
 Schoonoord
 Sleen
 Steenwijksmoer
 Stieltjeskanaal
 Valsteeg
 Veenhuizen
 Vlieghuis
 Vossebelt
 Wachtum
 Weijerswold
 Wezup
 Wezuperbrug
 Zweeloo
 Zwinderen

International relations
Coevorden is twinned with:

Transportation 
There are two railway stations in the municipality:
 Coevorden railway station
 Dalen railway station

Notable people 
 Johannes Benedictus van Heutsz (1851-1924). Gouverneur-generaal (1904-09), a Dutch military officer and governor general of the Dutch East Indies in 1904
 Albert Bouwers (1893 in Dalen – 1972) a Dutch optical engineer, worked with X-Rays
 Relus ter Beek (1944 in Coevorden – 2008) a Dutch politician
 Tim de Zeeuw (born 1956 in Sleen) a Dutch astronomer specializing in the galaxies
 Thijs Berman (born 1957 in Coevorden) a former journalist, a Dutch politician and a Member of the European Parliament
 Herman von Hebel (born 1961 in Coevorden) was a Registrar of the International Criminal Court
 Maxim Februari (born 1963 in Coevorden) a Dutch writer, philosopher and columnist
 Joël Voordewind (born 1965 in Sleen) a Dutch politician
 Don Pepijn Schipper (born 1980 in Coevorden) stage name Don Diablo is a Dutch DJ, record producer, musician and songwriter of electronic dance music
 Mark-Jan Fledderus (born 1982 in Coevorden) a Dutch retired footballer with 321 caps

See also

Fantasy Gardens, a replica of Coevorden Castle donated to Richmond, British Columbia for the Expo 86

Gallery

References

External links 

 

 
Cities in the Netherlands
Municipalities of Drenthe
Populated places in Drenthe
Star forts